Henri Fehr (Zurich, 2 February 1870 – Geneva, 2 November 1954) was a Swiss mathematician.  He was the founder of the Foundation for the Advancement of Mathematical Sciences, of the journal "Commentarii Mathematici Helvetici" and of the journal "L'Enseignement mathématique" along with Charles-Ange Laisant.  Fehr's interests in mathematics were scientific and social as is demonstrated by his involvement in academic life, committees for the improvement of mathematical instruction, education of teachers and internationalization of mathematics.

He studied in Switzerland and in France. His doctoral dissertation was about the method of Grassmann vectors applied to differential geometry.

Fehr was professor of the University of Geneva and later dean, vice-rector and rector. He was considered an pedagogue with an interest for the social aspects of the mathematics community and for the academic life.

He was an Invited Speaker at the ICM in 1904 in Heidelberg, in 1908 in Rome, in 1912 in Cambridge, England, in 1924 in Toronto, and in 1932 in Zürich.

Publications
 2nd ed. 1907.
with Théodore Flournoy and Édouard Claparède:

References

External links
 
 Fonds Henri Fehr, Bibliothèque de Genève, Catalogue des manuscrits

1870 births
1954 deaths
Scientists from Zürich
Swiss mathematicians
Academic staff of the University of Geneva